The Novo Selo School is the building of the former school in Novo Selo, Štip, North Macedonia. The same building is now the seat to the Rectorate of the Goce Delčev University. The building is registered as a Cultural Heritage of Macedonia. It is located in the yard of the Dormition of the Theotokos Church.

History

As a school building

The foundations of the building were laid in the 1870s. The first school year was in 1882. The revolutionary Goce Delčev taught at the school for two years in the period 1894–1896. Dame Gruev, Petar Pop Arsov, Todor Lazarov, Miše Razvigorov, Dimitar Mirasčiev also taught here. In 1912, the school employed 7 teachers who taught to 151 male and 100 female students. During the Balkan Wars, the school was turned into a hospital. During World War I, the building was used for military purposes.

During the Interwar Period, the school was a primary school from first to fourth grade. Before the start of the April War in 1941, the school was set on fire and almost completely destroyed, leaving only the foundations and some walls. Immediately after the arrival of the Bulgarian rule, construction works were carried out and the new version of the building was slightly different in appearance from the old building. Enrollment for students even began in September of that year.

In the period 1946–1949, the facility was seat of the Teachers School. Later, the Štip High School was situated here. In recent years, as a school institution, the facility was a school building within the "Vančo Prke" Elementary School.

As a rectorate

The building was renovated in order to become the seat of the Rectorate of the Goce Delčev University.

See also
 Dormition of the Theotokos Church - the seat of Novo Selo Parish and a cultural heritage site
 Saint John the Baptist Church - a cultural heritage site
 Holy Trinity Church - the cemetery church and a cultural heritage site
 Ascension of Christ Church - a cultural heritage site

Gallery

References

External links
 Official website of the Goce Delčev University

Buildings and structures in Štip
Schools in North Macedonia
1882 establishments in the Ottoman Empire